Pococera maritimalis is a species of pyralid moth in the family Pyralidae.

The MONA or Hodges number for Pococera maritimalis is 5603.

References

Further reading

External links

 

Epipaschiinae
Moths described in 1939